Jarvie is a hamlet in central Alberta, Canada within Westlock County. Jarvie is on the bank of the Pembina River, with the Canadian Northern Railway directly east to the townsite. In June 2020, the Jarvie General Store was destroyed by a fire, the store had been in operation for at least 110 years.

Demographics 

See also 
List of communities in Alberta
List of designated places in Alberta
List of hamlets in Alberta

References 

Hamlets in Alberta
Designated places in Alberta
Westlock County